Pukhavichy is a village in Zhytkavichy Raion, Homiel Voblast, Belarus, part of  Chyrvonensky Selsoviet (Chyrvonensky Rural District).

References

Villages in Belarus